Carolyn Jones-Young (born Carolyn Jones; July 29, 1969) is an American former professional women's basketball player. A 5'9" guard, she played for the New England Blizzard of the American Basketball League (1996–1998), and also played for the Portland Fire of the Women's National Basketball Association. She holds several ABL career records.

College
Carolyn Jones played for Auburn University, graduating in 1991. Jones led Auburn to the NCAA Final Four in both 1989 and 1990, losing in the final game both years. Jones was named to the NCAA All-tournament Team in 1990.

Auburn statistics
Source

USA Basketball
Jones was a member of the USA National team at the 1990 World Championships, held in Kuala Lumpur, Malaysia. The team won their opening round games fairly easily, with the closest of the first three games a 27-point victory over Czechoslovakia. Then they faced Cuba, a team that had beaten the US in exhibition matches only a few weeks earlier. The USA team was losing at halftime, but came back to win 87–78. The USA team found itself behind at halftime to Canada in their next game, but came back to win easily 95–70. After an easy match against Bulgaria, the USA team faced Czechoslovakia again, end achieved an almost identical result, winning 87–59. In the title match, the USA team won the gold medal with a score of 88–78. Jones averaged 2.8 points per game.

Jones was named to the team representing the US at the World University Games held during July 1991 in Sheffield, England. While the USA team had won gold in 1983, they finished with the silver in 1985, in fifth place in 1987, and did not field a team in 1989. The team was coached by Tara VanDerveer of Stanford. After winning opening games easily, the USA faced China in the medal round. The USA shot only 36% from the field, but limited the team from China to 35%, and won 79–76 to advance to the gold medal game. There they faced 7–0 Spain, but won 88–62 to claim the gold medal. Jones was the team's second leading scorer with 13 points per game, tied with Lisa Leslie's 13 points per game.

Jones was a member of the US National team that won the bronze medal in the 1992 Barcelona Olympics.

ABL career
Jones played in all 2½ seasons of the ABL, all for the New England Blizzard. She holds two significant ABL career records: most points per game (21.5 ppg)  and most free throws made (555). She is second only to Teresa Edwards in ABL career total points scored (Edwards had 2,035 points in 98 games, while Jones-Young scored 1,910 in 89 games).

Jones was named to the All-ABL 2nd team for the ABL's inaugural 1996–1997 season. She improved on that in her second ABL season, making the All-ABL 1st Team for 1997–1998. The league folded midway through the third season, so Jones is one of only five players to make the All-ABL list in both its seasons—the others being Teresa Edwards, Dawn Staley, Natalie Williams and Adrienne Goodson.

WNBA career
Jones married Charlton Young in 1998. In 1999, she was the 42nd overall pick in the fourth round of the WNBA draft, selected by the New York Liberty. In May 2000, the Liberty traded Jones-Young to the Portland Fire for Tari Phillips. Coming off a long layoff for injury and the birth of her first daughter, Jones-Young played in a total 42 games as a reserve for the Fire in 2001 and 2002. After her 2002 season, Jones-Young retired.

References

1969 births
Living people
All-American college women's basketball players
American women's basketball players
Auburn Tigers women's basketball players
Basketball players at the 1992 Summer Olympics
Basketball players from Mississippi
Bisexual sportspeople
LGBT basketball players
LGBT people from Mississippi
Medalists at the 1992 Summer Olympics
New England Blizzard players
New York Liberty draft picks
Olympic bronze medalists for the United States in basketball
People from Bay Springs, Mississippi
Portland Fire players
Shooting guards
Universiade gold medalists for the United States
Universiade medalists in basketball
United States women's national basketball team players